Mojmír Hampl (born 13 March 1975) is a Czech economist, who has been the Chairman of the Czech Fiscal Council since 2022. Previously, from 2019 to 2021, he worked for KPMG Czech Republic as a director responsible for financial sector services. Between 2006 and 2018 he served as a board member of the Czech National Bank. From 2008 he held the post of CNB Vice-Governor. He has been also a co-founder and a board member of the Institute of Economic Education INEV in Prague.

Career

Mojmír Hampl was born in Zlín and studied economics at the University of Economics, Prague. He defended his PhD thesis at the same institution in 2004. Afterwards he also pursued postgraduate education at the University of Surrey in the United Kingdom, where he obtained the title Master of Science.

He started to work at the Czech National Bank in 1998 as an economic analyst. Between 2002 and 2004, he worked at Česká spořitelna, a Czech commercial bank, as an analyst of financial markets in Central and Eastern Europe. At the same time he also served as an external advisor to the Czech Ministry of Finance responsible for the preparation of public finance reforms. Between 2004 and 2006 he served as a board member and director of the Czech Consolidation Agency.

President Václav Klaus appointed Hampl a member of the Czech National Bank's board on 1 December 2006 and then Vice-Governor on 1 March 2008. In 2012 Hampl was reappointed for another six-year term, which expired on 30 November 2018.

In 2019–2021, he worked for KPMG Czech Republic. As a director he was responsible for financial sector services.

In December 2021 he was elected to the Czech Fiscal Council by the Chamber of Deputies of the Czech Republic on a proposal of the Senate of the Czech Republic for a six-year term. In July 2022 he was elected the Chairman of the Czech Fiscal Council on a proposal of the Government of the Czech Republic.

Hampl is a member of the academic council of Škoda Auto University in Mladá Boleslav and scientific council of Tomas Bata University in Zlín, and was an editorial board member of the Czech history newspaper The Twentieth Century. He lectures at Czech and foreign universities, including University of Oxford.

In 1999 Hampl received the prize Young Economist of the year awarded by the Czech Economic Society. He has published around 150 popular and scientific articles in the fields of economic methodology, public choice theory, monetary policy, natural resources and general economic theory.

Mojmír Hampl is married with two children.

Controversies
Mojmír Hampl has been a supporter of helicopter money, which he calls "direct support of consumption." He argues that, in a deep recession accompanied by deflation, central banks should create new money and send them to households via central bank digital currency. According to Hampl, such a policy would circumvent the complicated monetary transmission mechanism inherent in the use of quantitative easing and support aggregate demand directly. His proposals were endorsed by, for example, Eric Lonergan. However, critics claim that helicopter money drops could lead to a sharp increase in inflation rates. Mojmír Hampl is also opposed to euro adoption in the Czech Republic and gave a speech in the European Parliament on the potential break-up of the euro area.In his speeches he  frequently questions a potential of cryptocurrencies to become a full-fledged alternative to conventional money and defends a traditional elastic money system. He has also been a fervent opponent of the introduction of the European Union financial transaction tax.

In 2010 he had a public dispute with the IMF caused by his claim in the Austrian newspaper Der Standard that the IMF by its communication effectively worsened the impacts of the financial crisis of 2007–2008 on Central and Eastern Europe. The IMF denied this claim.

References

External links
 Personal website

1975 births
Living people
21st-century Czech economists
Central bankers
Prague University of Economics and Business alumni
People from Zlín